In 2016, following the EU Regulation 1143/2014 on Invasive Alien Species (IAS), the European Commission published a first list of 37 IAS of Union concern. The list was first updated in 2017 and comprised 49 species. Since the second update in 2019, 66 species are listed as IAS of EU concern.

The species on the list are subject to restrictions on keeping, importing, selling, breeding and growing. Member States of the European Union must take measures to stop their spread, implement monitoring and preferably eradicate these species. Even if they are already widespread in the country they are expected to manage the species to avoid further spread.



Sortable table of invasive alien species of Union concern

Resources
EU brochure on the 2017 list update with 49 species (pdf format)
JRC report on the baseline distribution of the 37 species on the first list

See also
List of invasive species in Europe (extensive list of alien species occurring in Europe)

References 

European Union and the environment
European Union law
European Union-related lists
Union
Invasive species in Europe